Die Vielgeliebte is a 1934 operetta by Nico Dostal to a libretto by Franz Maregg and Rudolf Köller.

Recording
Elfie Mayerhofer, Heinz Hoppe, Hedda Heuser, Harry Friedauer, Kurt Großkurth, Choir of the Bayerischen Rundfunks, Münchner Rundfunkorchester, Werner Schmidt-Boelcke 1958

References

Operas
1934 operas
Operas by Nico Dostal
German-language operettas